The Muvman Liberater is a left-wing political party in Mauritius  founded in 2014 by Ivan Collendavelloo, a lawyer and career-politician, as a breakaway from the Mauritian Militant Movement (MMM) in protest against MMM leader Paul Berenger's alliance with Prime Minister Navin Ramgoolam's Labour Party. It won seven seats in the 2014 General Election, with the elected MPs being Ivan Collendavelloo, Sangeet Fowdar, Anil Gayan, Ravi Rutna, Anwar Husnoo, Eddy Boissezon and Toolsyraj Benydin.

The party Muvman Liberater (ML) forms part of the Alliance Morisyen which was successfully re-elected into office at the November 2019 general elections. The alliance (Alliance Morisyen) also includes the Mouvement Militant Mauricien (MSM), Mouvement Alan Ganoo (MAG) and Plateforme Militante (PM). 

Collendavelloo has stated his intention to reunify the MMM.

References 

Political parties in Mauritius
Political parties established in 2014
Socialist parties in Mauritius
2014 establishments in Mauritius